The Castle of Monção is a medieval castle in the civil parish of Monção e Troviscoso, municipality of Monção, the Portuguese district of Viana do Castelo.

It is classified as a National Monument.

Moncao
Castle Moncao
Moncao
Buildings and structures in Monção